Devonta Pollard (born July 7, 1994) is an American professional basketball player who last played for Pioneros de Los Mochis. A 6'8 power forward, Pollard played college basketball for Alabama, East Mississippi Community College and Houston.

High school career
Pollard played high school basketball at Kemper County. Pollard was a 5-star prospect by Rivals.com and was ranked as the seventh-best small forward in his class and the 22nd best prospect in the nation by the organization. He led team to the Mississippi 3A State Championship, averaging 23.8 points, 15.7 rebounds and 5.1 blocks to earn Mississippi Mr. Basketball title.

College career
Pollard chose Alabama to start his college career. As a freshman, Pollard was a role player, but he did have a lot of playing time. The following year, he transferred to East Mississippi Community College in order to be closer to his family. As a sophomore, Pollard averaged 12 points and 6.7 rebounds per game, being the third best scorer of the team.

As a junior, he decided to join Houston, being coached by Kelvin Sampson. Pollard became one of the top big men in the American Athletic Conference, averaging 11.4 points and 6.4 rebounds per game. Pollard finished his senior season averaging 14 points and 5.7 rebounds per game being the second scoring and rebounding leader for the Cougars.

Professional career

2016–17 Season
Following the close of his college career, Pollard was not drafted in the 2016 NBA draft. On October 5, 2016, he signed with Liepājas Lauvas of the Latvian Basket League. In November 2016, he left Liepājas and signed with Koroivos Amaliadas for the rest of the season.

2017–18 Season
On October 30, 2017, he moved to Al Sadd Doha of the Qatari Basketball League.

Career statistics

College

|-
| style="text-align:left;"|2012–13
| style="text-align:left;"|Alabama
| 36 || 7 || 17.9 || .371 || .125 || .614 || 3.1 || 0.6 || .7 || .6 || 3.9
|-
| style="text-align:left;"|2014–15
| style="text-align:left;"|Houston
| 32 || 26 || 30.5 || .457 || .000 || .725 || 6.4 || 1.2 || 1.2 || .4 || 11.4
|-
| style="text-align:left;"|2015–16
| style="text-align:left;"|Houston
| 32 || 25 || 29.7 || .479 || .500 || .747 || 5.7 || 1.6 || .9 || .6 || 14.0
|- class="sortbottom"
| style="text-align:center;" colspan="2"|Career
| 100 || 58 || 25.7 || .450 || .158 || .719 || 5.0 || 1.1 || .9 || .2 || 9.5

References

External links
 Eurobasket.com profile

1994 births
Living people
Alabama Crimson Tide men's basketball players
American expatriate basketball people in Canada
American expatriate basketball people in Greece
American expatriate basketball people in Latvia
American expatriate basketball people in Qatar
American men's basketball players
Basketball players from Mississippi
BK Liepājas Lauvas players
East Mississippi Community College alumni
Houston Cougars men's basketball players
Junior college men's basketball players in the United States
Koroivos B.C. players
McDonald's High School All-Americans
Niagara River Lions players
Parade High School All-Americans (boys' basketball)
People from Kemper County, Mississippi
Pioneros de Los Mochis players
Power forwards (basketball)